Tandragee Castle, Tandragee, County Armagh, Northern Ireland, was built in 1837 by The 6th Duke of Manchester as the family's Irish home. The Duke of Manchester acquired the estate through his marriage to Millicent Sparrow (1798–1848).

History
During the Plantation of Ulster the castle at Tandragee became the property of Sir Oliver St John, Lord Deputy of Ireland. He rebuilt the original stronghold of the O'Hanlon Clan. During the Irish Rebellion of 1641, however, the O'Hanlons attempted to regain their lands – the result was the castle being ruined; it remained so for two hundred years.

The castle and estate were sold by The 10th Duke of Manchester (who was born at Tandragee) in the 1950s, and it was purchased by Mr. Hutchinson, a businessman from Tandragee.  Today the Castle houses offices for the Tayto potato crisp factory and the park's demesne incorporates a golf course.

References

External links
Photograph

Houses completed in 1837
Castles in County Armagh
Grade B1 listed buildings